The 1989 season of the Tongatapu Inter Club Championship was the 16th season of top flight association football competition in Tonga. Navutoka FC won the championship for the first time.

References 

Tonga Major League seasons
1989 in Tongan sport